The General German Industrial Exhibition was designed to demonstrate German industry to a global audience, but was adversely impacted by a cholera epidemic.

It ran from 15 July 1854 until 15 October. There more than 5,000 visitors a day
with more than 90,000 visitors on the first day.

Building
The building, the Glaspalast, followed the architecture of The Crystal Palace three years earlier in London. It was made of glass and cast iron, over two levels inspired.

Cholera
There had been global cases of cholera (the third cholera pandemic before the festival, but the risk  of it was downplayed and the exhibition and a concurrent festival still took place. By August the epidemic hit Munich, 3,000 people eventually died of cholera and some contracting it at the exhibition including a woman from Thaining visiting Munich to see the exhibit.

Medals

The medals showed Maximilian II on the obverse and the Glaspalast on reverse.

Legacy
The Glaspalast had been intended to be used as a botanic garden, but was used for exhibitions which helped establish Munich's reputation, until it burned in 1931. The  was moved to the Haidhausen quarter.

References

1854 establishments in Bavaria
World's fairs in Germany